was a Japanese koto player and composer. He was renowned all over Japan for his skill at the koto and also received acclaim for his compositions. He was married to Kazue Sawai, also a koto player, and their son Hikaru Sawai is also a musician.

Born in Aichi Prefecture, Sawai graduated from the Tokyo National University of Fine Arts and Music in 1958.

Sawai worked with a number of Western musicians, including Wadada Leo Smith and also released a CD of himself playing Jazzy Bach on the Koto.

Sawai also invented a Koto of his own also called as the Tadao koto which also creates good sounds.

Discography
J.S. Bach Is Alive and Well and Doing His Thing on the Koto, Sawai (first koto), Kazue Sawai (second koto), Hozan Yamamoto (shakuhachi), Sadanori Nakamure (guitar), Tatsoro Takimoto (bass), Takeshi Inomata (drums). RCA Red Seal, 1971, LSC-3227

References

1938 births
1997 deaths
Koto players
Tokyo University of the Arts alumni
Musicians from Aichi Prefecture
20th-century Japanese musicians
20th-century Japanese male musicians